The 2023 Illinois Fighting Illini football team will represent the University of Illinois in the West Division of the Big Ten Conference during the 2022 NCAA Division I FBS football season. The Fighting Illini are expected to be led by Bret Bielema in his third season as the team's head coach. They play their home games at Memorial Stadium in Champaign, Illinois.

Schedule

Coaching staff

References

Illinois
Illinois Fighting Illini football seasons
Illinois Fighting Illini football